Darrhon or Darron (Greek: Δάῤῥων) was a Paeonian god of healing, whose cult was adopted by the ancient Macedonians, as mentioned by Hesychius as a Macedonian Daemon and attested hapax in one inscription of Pella
c. 200-150 BC.

Excavations revealed a sanctuary of Darrhon in ancient Pella. It has been argued that while Darrhon (Greek:Δάῤῥων) was initially a minor deity, he was later identified and worshiped as Asclepius.

Etymology
It has been suggested that "Darrhon" is a Macedonian-styled name of Greek participle θαρρῶν tharrhon, meaning "giving courage, making bold". Θάρρων, Tharrhon, is an Eretrian eponym. Alternatively, his name might be derived from the Thracian tribe of Derrones in the north part of the Strymon valley, compare Apollo Derenus in Abdera

See also 

 Apollo
 Eileithyia
 Hygeia
 Panacea

Notes

Religion in ancient Macedonia
Greek gods
Health gods
Daimons
Paeonia (kingdom)
Ancient Pella
Asclepius